Tuckahoe is a census-designated place (CDP) in Henrico County, Virginia, United States.  It is a western suburb of Richmond. The population of Tuckahoe was 44,990 at the 2010 census. It is named after the area's history as the site of Thomas Randolph's Tuckahoe Plantation which still stands along the James River.

Geography

The western boundary of Tuckahoe is formed by Tuckahoe Creek, a large undeveloped swampy creek which forms part of the boundary between Goochland County and Henrico County.

Climate
Tuckahoe is located in the warm temperate climate zone and has Hot and Humid summers and relatively cold winters. Precipitation is evenly distributed throughout the year. Snowfall in Tuckahoe averages about 13 inches each year and occurs on about 7–8 days a year. White Christmas's do not occur most years in Tuckahoe but are not uncommon. The probability for a White Christmas each year is seven percent. White Christmas's were observed in December 2009 and December 2010. However, there are many other years when there is accumulated snow already on the ground at Christmas time.

Demographics

As of the census of 2010, there were 44,990 people, 18,126 households, and 11,963 families residing in the CDP. The population density was 2,102.7 people per square mile (811.7/km2). There were 18,647 housing units at an average density of 906.7/sq mi (350.0/km2). The racial makeup of the CDP was 75.9% Non-Hispanic White, 9.3% African American , 0.1% Native American, 4.7% Asian (2.3% Nepalese, 1.4% Indian, 0.5% Chinese, 0.4% Vietnamese, 0.1% Other)  0.07% Pacific Islander, 0.2% from other races, and 2.5% from two or more races. Hispanic or Latino of any race were 6.9% of the population.

There were 18,126 households, out of which 29.8% had children under the age of 18 living with them, 55.0% were married couples living together, 8.6% had a female householder with no husband present, and 34.0% were non-families. 28.4% of all households were made up of individuals, and 11.1% had someone living alone who was 65 years of age or older. The average household size was 2.36 and the average family size was 2.92.

In the CDP, the population was spread out, with 23.2% under the age of 18, 6.6% from 18 to 24, 27.7% from 25 to 44, 24.7% from 45 to 64, and 17.8% who were 65 years of age or older. The median age was 40 years. For every 100 females, there were 87.3 males. For every 100 females age 18 and over, there were 83.4 males.

The median income for a household in the CDP was $65,420, and the median income for a family was $89,320. Males had a median income of $41,286 versus $31,445 for females. The per capita income for the CDP was $41,883. About 2.4% of families and 4.0% of the population were below the poverty line, including 4.2% of those under age 18 and 4.0% of those age 65 or over. The median income is much lower than the mean income due to a high income disparity.

Gallery

References

Census-designated places in Henrico County, Virginia
Census-designated places in Virginia